This article lists all the rugby league footballers who have been selected for the Australian Schoolboys, since its inception in 1972. Each year the best high school players in Australia are chosen to either represent the Schoolboys on an overseas tour or host a touring country in Australia. In 1978, 1983 and 1987, merit teams were selected who did not play anybody. The players selected in those years are still considered Australian Schoolboys. The 1990 side was originally a merit team, but they later played a one-off match.

Players are listed in alphabetical order by the year they were first selected.

List of players

References

Australia Schoolboy